Leignon is a village of Wallonia and a district of the municipality of Ciney, located in the province of Namur, Belgium. It was a municipality itself until the fusion of the municipalities in 1977.

It is served by its own railway station, on the Namur - Arlon - Luxembourg line. The next station to the north is Ciney and the next station to the south-east is Chapois.

References

Sub-municipalities of Ciney
Former municipalities of Namur (province)